The following article presents a summary of the 1997 football (soccer) season in Paraguay.

First division results

Torneo Apertura
The Apertura tournament was played in a single all-play-all system. After every draw during this stage the game went on to a penalty kick shootout, awarding two points to the winner of the shootout and one point to the losing team. At the end, the top eight teams qualified to a playoff stage to determine the Apertura champion.

Note: an extra match had to be played between Sportivo Luqueño and Nacional to decide the 8th spot for the playoff stage since both teams finished with the same number of points. The extra match was won by Sportivo Luqueño 2-0. Also, draws were done to determine the 3rd and 5th place and they were won by Sol de America and San Lorenzo respectively.

Apertura playoff stage
The top eight teams qualified to this stage and were given bonus points based on their final standing in the table. Two groups of four teams were made, with the top two of each group advancing to a playoff stage.

Group stage
Group A

Group B

Semifinals

|}

Apertura final

|}

Cerro P. wins the Apertura tournament.

Torneo Clausura
The Clausura tournament was played in a single all-play-all system. After every draw during this stage the game went on to a penalty kick shootout, awarding two points to the winner of the shootout and one point to the losing team. At the end, the top eight teams qualified to a playoff stage to determine the Clausura champion.

Clausura playoff stage
The top eight teams qualified to this stage and were given bonus points based on their final standing in the table. Two groups of four teams were made, with the top two of each group advancing to a playoff stage.

Group stage
Group A

Group B

Semifinals

|}

Clausura final

|}

Olimpia wins the Clausura tournament.

National championship game
The national championship game was played between the Apertura and Clausura tournaments winners.

|}

Olimpia declared as national champions by aggregate score of 2-1.

Relegation / Promotion
 Tembetary and Sport Colombia automatically relegated to the second division after finishing last and second-to-last in the accumulated table Apertura/Clausura (Opening/Closing).
 12 de Octubre promoted to the first division by winning the second division tournament.

Qualification to international competitions
Cerro Porteño qualified to the 1998 Copa Libertadores by winning the Torneo Apertura.
Olimpia qualified to the 1998 Copa Libertadores by winning the Torneo Clausura.

Lower divisions results

Paraguayan teams in international competitions
Copa Libertadores 1997:
Club Guaraní: Round of 16
Cerro Porteño: Group Stage
Supercopa Sudamericana 1997:
Olimpia: Group Stage
Copa CONMEBOL 1997:
Sportivo Luqueño: First round

Paraguay national team
The following table lists all the games played by the Paraguay national football team in official competitions during 1997.

References
 Paraguay 1997 by Eli Schmerler, Andy Bolander and Juan Pablo Andrés at RSSSF
 Diario ABC Color

 
Seasons in Paraguayan football
Paraguay 1997